Htilominlo (also called Nadaungmya or Zeya Theinkha Uzana; 1175 – 1235) was king of Pagan dynasty of Burma (Myanmar) from 1211 to 1235. His 24-year reign marked the beginning of the gradual decline of Pagan dynasty. It was the first to see the impact of over a century of continuous growth of tax-free religious wealth, which had greatly reduced the potential tax base. Htilominlo was the last of the temple builders although most of his temples were in remote lands not in the Pagan region, reflecting the deteriorating state of royal treasury.

All the royal chronicles say he was succeeded by his son Kyaswa. But two contemporary inscriptions indicate that another son of his Naratheinga Uzana was at least acting as the regent towards the end of his reign.

Early life
Htilominlo was born to King Sithu II and his queen Saw Mya Kan. Chronicles do not agree on the birth, death and reign dates. According to the Zatadawbon Yazawin chronicle, considered the most accurate chronicle for the Pagan period, he was born on 4 February 1175. The table below lists the dates given by the four main chronicles.

Reign
The king, a devout Buddhist and a scholar, gave up the command of the army, and left the day-to-day affairs to a privy council consisted of ministers, the forebear of the Hluttaw, or the supreme administrative body of government. He focused his energies on religion and temple-building. He completed the majestic Gawdawpalin Temple, begun by his father Narapatisithu, built the Mahabodhi, a replica of the Buddhagaya temple, and the Htilominlo Temple, named after himself.

His reign was largely peaceful, except for one rebellion north of Tagaung, which was put down by his commander in chief. By all accounts, he was popular with the people. Still he never really governed, and was especially oblivious to the growing problem of reduced tax base brought about continuous growth of tax free religious holdings. To be sure, his predecessors did not face the problem, and his successors also continued to ignore the problem, where by the 1280s, two-thirds of Upper Burma's cultivable land had been alienated to the religion. Thus the throne also lost resources necessary to retain the loyalty of courtiers and military servicemen, inviting a vicious circle of internal disorders and external challenges by Mons, Mongols and Shans.

Notes

References

Bibliography
 
 
 
 
 
 
 
 
 
 

Pagan dynasty
1175 births
1235 deaths
13th-century Burmese monarchs